Hoysala Karnataka Brahmins are a community of Smarta Brahmins originating in the Hoysala Empire. The empire ruled most of what is now Karnataka between the 10th and the 14th centuries.

Diet

The community has traditionally followed a strict vegetarian sattvic diet consisting of seasonal fruits and vegetables (except onions and garlic), whole grains, dairy, nuts, seeds, and oil. A typical breakfast item is uppittu (a thick semolina porridge with seasonings and vegetables). A typical dinner may include saaru (a thin soup made with lentils, tamarind, tomatoes, and spices) with rice, vegetable palya, and curd rice.

Other Hoysala Karnataka dishes include:
 Badanekayi-aloogedde gojju, a curry  made with eggplant and potatoes
 Gulpavate, a sweet made with dried fruit, ghee, jaggery, and toasted wheat flour
 Mysuru kootu, a Karnataka-style lentil and vegetable stew 
 Nucchina unde, quenelle-shaped lentil dumplings

Titles and surnames
Common titles of community members include Bhat and Jois, which are also used as surnames. Rao is another common surname.

Associations
The Hoysala Karnataka Sangha formed in 1908 but eventually disbanded.

See also
 Forward Castes

References

Kannada Brahmins
Indian surnames